Park Gil-ra (Korean: 박길라; 1965 –1986) was a South Korean actress and singer.

She was born in 1965. She was in "The Diary of High School Girl (고교생 일기)". She became known as "The Talent Singer(탈렌트 가수)". In October 1986, she suffered a heart attack and died.

Songs 
Tree and Bird
We really can't love you
Love
My love Annie
You're a flower
Nation, Nation
Rage of Love
Face buried in your heart
Contradiction of Love
Stray lovers

References

1965 births
1986 deaths
20th-century South Korean women singers